William Lowndes Calhoun (November 23, 1837November 16, 1908) was an American attorney and politician from the state of Georgia who served as the 26th Mayor of Atlanta. A member of the Democratic Party, Calhoun is the first in a string of Democrat mayors that lasts to the present day.

Biography

Calhoun was born in Decatur, Georgia, son of fellow Atlanta mayor James Calhoun. The family moved to Atlanta in 1852 and, at the age of sixteen, William began reading law at his father's firm. He passed the bar in 1857.

In March 1862, Calhoun enlisted in the Confederate States Army and was commissioned as captain of Company K of the 42nd Georgia Infantry. He served in Knoxville, Tennessee, and then in the Vicksburg Campaign, where he and his regiment were surrendered by John C. Pemberton on July 4, 1863.  After being exchanged, Calhoun served in the Atlanta Campaign and was wounded at the Battle of Resaca. After his recovery, he served in the Army of Tennessee under General Hood in Tennessee.

Returning to Atlanta after the war, he served in the state legislature from 1872 to 1876 and, following in his late father's footsteps, was elected Mayor of Atlanta in 1879. During his term of service, he inaugurated the city's street paving system.

He left his law practice to serve as judge of the Court of Ordinary of Fulton County from 1881 to 1897.

Notes

Mayors of Atlanta
Members of the Georgia House of Representatives
Confederate States Army officers
People of Georgia (U.S. state) in the American Civil War
American Civil War prisoners of war
1837 births
1908 deaths
Calhoun family
American people of Scotch-Irish descent
American lawyers admitted to the practice of law by reading law